Rotterdam Panda's was a professional ice hockey team in Rotterdam, Netherlands. They played in the Dutch Eredivisie, the highest-level hockey division in the Netherlands. Home games were played at the Weena-ijshal, a (now-closed) arena near Rotterdam Central train station.

History

Ice hockey had been played in Rotterdam since the 1950s. The Rotterdam Panda's team played six seasons in the Eredivisie, winning its first national championship during its first season. It attracted several players from other teams in the Eredivisie, especially Nijmegen.

The team sported a green and white jersey with the logo of the World Wildlife Fund panda as a crest.

Securing a home arena was a major problem for the Panda's. The Weena-ijshal shut its doors in 1993. Since then, there has been no commitment to build a new ice hockey arena in Rotterdam, despite discussions as lately as 2007.

Season results

Note: GP = Games played, W = Wins, T = Ties, L = Losses, GF = Goals for, GA = Goals against, Pts = Points

Notable players
Ron Berteling
Henk Hille
Mari Saris
Alexander Schaafsma
Sean Simpson
Ben Tijnagel
Harrie van Heumen
Bill Wensink

Championships

Dutch National Championship

3 times: 1986-87; 1988–89; 1989–90

References

External links
 1986 Team photo with player and staff names (Dutch)
 Netherlands Ice Hockey Federation history (Dutch)

 
Ice hockey teams in the Netherlands
Ice hockey clubs established in 1986
Sports clubs in Rotterdam